Paján is a town in Manabí Province of Ecuador.

Pajan may also refer to:
 the fictional country in the world of Okko.